Below is a  list of new islands created since the beginning of the 20th century by volcanism, erosion, glacial retreat, or other mechanisms. One of the most famous new volcanic islands is the small island of Surtsey, located in the Atlantic Ocean south of Iceland. It first emerged from the ocean surface in 1963. Two years later, Surtsey was declared a nature reserve for the study of ecological succession; plants, insects, birds, seals, and other forms of life have since established themselves on the island.

Another noted new island is Anak Krakatau (the so-called "child of Krakatoa", which formed in the flooded caldera of that notorious volcano in Indonesia), which emerged only in 1930. Ample rainforests have grown there, although they are often destroyed by frequent eruptions. A population of many wild animals, including insects, birds, humanborne rats, and even monitor lizards, have also settled there.

Didicas Volcano off the northern coast of Luzon Island in the Philippines, was first created during a four-year eruption from 1856 to 1860 but eventually got washed away. In 1900, three tall rock masses were left by another eruption.  During the  1952 eruption, the island finally became permanent which was further bolstered by subsequent eruptions in 1969 and 1978 into a -high island.

Uunartoq Qeqertoq is an island off the east coast of Greenland that appeared to have split from the mainland because of glacial retreat between 2002 and 2005; however, it is believed to have been a true island, with or without glacial covering, for many thousands of years.

In February and March 2009, a vigorous eruption created a new island near Hunga Ha'apai in the Tongan Islands of the southwest Pacific. By the end of the activity, however, the new land mass was connected to Hunga Ha'apai. Similar activity occurred again in December 2014 and January 2015.

On September 24, 2013 a new island Zalzala Koh emerged off the coast of Gwadar, as a result of a strong earthquake that hit south and southwest Pakistan measuring 7.8 on the Richter magnitude scale.

On November 21, 2013 an unnamed islet emerged off the coast of Nishinoshima, a small, uninhabited island in the Ogasawara chain, which is also known as the Bonin Islands.

List of recently created islands
This is a list of new islands that formed during the 20th and the 21st centuries. Of those formed by submarine volcanoes, only Anak Krakatau and Surtsey are currently islands, and Surtsey is the only one that is expected to survive, Ilha Nova is now connected to Faial Island. Newly created landmass adjacent to Nishinoshima is now connected to Nishinoshima.

References

Geology-related lists
Lists of islands
Submarine volcanoes
Volcanism